Elachista helonoma is a species of moth in the family Elachistidae. This species is endemic to New Zealand. It is classified as "At Risk, Relict'" by the Department of Conservation.

Taxonomy 
It was first described by Edward Meyrick in 1889 using specimens collected at the Port Hills in Christchurch and named Elachista helonoma. George Hudson described and illustrated the species under the same name in 1928. John S. Dugdale placed the species within the genus Cosmiotes in 1971 and followed this placement in his annotated catalogue in 1988. However the genus Cosmiotes is now regarded as a synonym of Elachista and as a result the species name is again Elachista helonoma. The lectotype specimen is held at the Natural History Museum, London.

Description 
Meyrick described the adult moth of the species as follows:

Distribution 
This species is endemic to New Zealand. It can be found in Mid Canterbury and the Mackenzie areas.

Life cycle and behaviour 
The larvae of this species are leaf miners and are very difficult to detect. The adults of the species are on the wing between January and March.

Host plants and habitat 
Elachista helonoma is  found exclusively in short tussock grasslands.  The likely host of this species is Poa cita.

Conservation status 
This species has been classified as having the "At Risk, Relict" conservation status under the New Zealand Threat Classification System.

References

Moths described in 1889
helonoma
Moths of New Zealand
Endemic fauna of New Zealand
Endangered biota of New Zealand
Taxa named by Edward Meyrick
Endemic moths of New Zealand